Monumension is the sixth studio album by Norwegian heavy metal band Enslaved. It was released on 27 November 2001, through Osmose Productions. It is Enslaved's first album to feature lyrics sung entirely in English,  although some versions of the album include the Old Norse track "Sigmundskvadet" as a bonus.

Monumension was the last Enslaved album to feature guitarist R. Kronheim; Arve Isdal would replace him on Below the Lights.

Track listing

Critical reception 

From the reviews the album has received, Monumension has been generally well received.

AllMusic praised the album, calling it "astounding" and "truly daring". Chronicles of Chaos's review was generally favorable, though writing, "Monumension occasionally comes across as too over-the-top in terms of its experimentation, and the album as a whole lacks some focus and consistency."

Personnel 
 Enslaved

 Ivar Bjørnson – guitar, synthesizers, organ, piano, special effects, choir vocals on "Sigmundskvadet", production, mixing
 R. Kronheim – guitar, vocals, special effects, choir vocals on "Sigmundskvadet", production, mixing
 Grutle Kjellson – bass guitar, vocals, choir vocals on "Sigmundskvadet", production, mixing
 Dirge Rep (Per Husebø) – drums, percussion, special effects, choir vocals on "Sigmundskvadet", production, mixing

 Additional personnel

 Dennis Reksten – minimoog synthesizers, keyboards, vocoder, special effects
 Trygve Mathiesen - lead vocals on "Hollow Inside" and "Sigmundskvadet"
 Trond Veland - backing vocals on "Vision: Sphere of the Elements – A Monument Part II"
 Kai Lie – additional choir vocals on "Sigmundskvadet"

Production 

 Pytten (Eirik Hundvin) – production, recording, engineering
 Davide Bertolini – recording, engineering
 Herbrand Larsen – recording, engineering
 Jørgen Træen – mixing

References 

Enslaved (band) albums
2001 albums
Season of Mist albums